Joyce Fitch Rymer (née Fitch; 3 April 1922 – 26 July 2012) was a tennis player from Australia who reached the women's singles final of the 1946 Australian Championships, losing to Nancye Wynne Bolton 6–4, 6–4. She teamed with Mary Bevis Hawton to win the women's doubles title at the 1946 Australian Championships, defeating Bolton and Thelma Coyne Long in the final 9–7, 6–4. Rymer and Hawton reached the women's doubles final at the 1947 and 1951 Australian Championships, losing both years to the Bolton-Long team. In 1946, 1947 and 1949 she reached the finals of the Australian Championships in mixed doubles with partner, John Bromwich and again in 1950 with Eric Sturgess, losing all four times.

Fitch married John Oliver Rymer in May 1951 and did not play competitive tennis until 1955 when she played doubles with her longtime doubles partner Mary Bevis Hawton.

Grand Slam finals

Singles: 1 (1 runners-up)

Doubles: 2 (1 title, 1 runner-up)

Mixed Doubles: 4 (4 runner-ups)

Grand Slam singles tournament timeline

1In 1946 and 1947, the French Championships were held after Wimbledon.

See also 
 Performance timelines for all female tennis players who reached at least one Grand Slam final

References

1922 births
2012 deaths
Australian Championships (tennis) champions
Australian female tennis players
Tennis people from Victoria (Australia)
Grand Slam (tennis) champions in women's doubles